The Mount Zion Church was a historic church building near Big Sandy, Tennessee.  It was a hewn log structure built in either 1812 or 1845 and listed on the National Register of Historic Places in 1973.  It was removed from the National Register in 2012.

This building, which is still standing, might be confused with the extant Mt. Zion Church and Cemetery located approximately twenty miles north in Henry County, Tennessee.

History

It was built to house a Baptist congregation organized by B. S. Browning. The date of its completion has been given as either 1812, as suggested by a photo of the sign on the building, or as 1845 as listed in the National Register of Historic Places database. The builders were Joe Arnold, Eligh Hollaman, James Garner and another unknown person.

It was destroyed by fire in the early 1990s.

References

Baptist churches in Tennessee
Log cabins in the United States
Churches on the National Register of Historic Places in Tennessee
Churches completed in 1845
19th-century Baptist churches in the United States
Buildings and structures in Benton County, Tennessee
National Register of Historic Places in Benton County, Tennessee
Log buildings and structures on the National Register of Historic Places in Tennessee
Wooden churches in Tennessee